Silver Cross Hospital is a 302-bed acute care/general hospital that was founded in 1895. The hospital was located in Joliet, Illinois, before it relocated to its new campus on February 26, 2012, in New Lenox, Illinois.

References

1895 establishments in Illinois
Buildings and structures in Will County, Illinois
Hospitals established in 1895
Hospitals in Illinois